Perwîz Cîhanî (born 1955), is a Kurdish writer and novelist. He was born near Khoy in northwest of Iran. Around 1977–1978, he began writing poems and short stories in Kurdish, and collecting pieces of Kurdish folklore. In 1984, he worked in the Kurdish Radio of Urmia, presenting two cultural programs. During the same period, he was active in the Kurdish journal of Sirwe, where he published several articles. In 1986, due to the content of his radio programs, he was dismissed from his job in radio. He continued working full-time in Sirwe until he was forced to leave Iran and sought refuge in Switzerland as a political asylum in 1995. He has worked with several online Kurdish journals such as Mehname, Avesta and Nûdem.

Works
Bilîcan. Novel, 512pp., Doz Publishers, Istanbul, 2002,  . Re-published by Nefel Publishers, Sweden, 2002 . .
Ax Şilêrok (Collection of Poems), 64 pp., Apec Publishers, Spanga, Sweden, 1998. .
Peyam: Komele Kurteçîrok (Collection of Short Stories), 126 pp., Orient-Réalités, Genève, 1997. 
Li Ser Wergera M. Emîn Bozarslan a Mem û Zîna Ehmedê Xanî (Regarding Emîn Bozarslan's transliteration of Mem û Zîn of Ahmad Khani), Zend Journal, Kurdish Institute of Istanbul, No.8 .
Rênivîsa Kurdî (Kurdish Grammar), Salahaddin Ayoobi Publishers, Urmia, Iran.

References

External links
Ez kîme? (Who Am I?), Perwîz Cîhanî's biography.
An Interview with Perwîz Cîhanî (in Kurdish).
Perwîz Cîhanî, Autorinnen und Autoren der Schweiz (in German).

Kurdish-language writers
1955 births
Living people
Kurdish scholars